Hypermerina is a genus of moths in the family Saturniidae. The genus was erected by Claude Lemaire in 1969.

Species
Hypermerina kasyi Lemaire, 1969

References

Hemileucinae